National Broadcasting Services of Thailand (NBT) is the broadcasting arm of the Government Public Relations Department (PRD), a division of the Thai Government. It operates comprehensive media services comprising radio, television networks (terrestrial and satellite), online services and social media.

Terrestrial stations

Radio stations 

Radio Thailand is the radio division of NBT. It was established on 25 February 1930 and currently comprises 5 AM, 6 FM radio stations and World Service, a foreign language international shortwave radio station launched on 20 October 1938.

Television Channels

NBT TV 
NBT TV (or NBT (Digital) 2 HD), formerly TVT11, is the television division and free-to-air channel of NBT.

The broadcasting of TVT11 began on 11 July 1988, when TV9 (currently known as Modernine TV) split into two channels. It was firstly aimed at viewers in the countryside. Some elements such as sex and violence are censored as NBT is one of the government departments under direct control.

NBTTV is also available over the TrueVisions direct broadcast satellite platform on channel 5. Presently, it is broadcasting on channel 2.

On 1 April 2008, the television channel began to broadcast 24 hours a day, offering more programs for viewers who stay up late to watch television

On 1 April 2008, TVT11 television stations were once again restructured by Dr. Mun Pattanothai, the then Information Minister and renamed NBTTV.

Educational television programs were aired through this channel from 1988 to 1999, alternate with TV9 in the afternoon until 1994 where it airs in the morning. Daytime programming on TV9 started on 1 March 1994 has caused ETV to be broadcast only on TV11.

NBTTV and the radio stations under National Broadcasting Services of Thailand broadcasts from their headquarters in Din Daeng, Bangkok.

During the analog era, it broadcasts on VHF band III, although some parts of Thailand it transmits the signal in UHF where it is normally tuned to band 2. In the Bangkok Metropolitan Area the VHF channel for TV11 is 11, with a weaker transmission on channel 10 in certain parts of the Bangkok Metropolitan Area. It is also available over the NBTi DVB-T test transmission over a frequency of 658 MHz, SID 2. As of 1 January 2007, it is also available over a test DMB-T/H transmission on Band III.

NBT Regional channels 
Four regions of Thailand (North, Northeast, Central and South) have their own variant of the regional channel and broadcasts on DTT channel 11.

NBT World 
NBT World, launched in 2013, is the network's 24/7 English language television service aimed for Thai, ASEAN and Asian communities broadcast Internationally via cable and satellite. (Currently broadcast and can only be watching via the station pagesince 1 October 2022) However NBT World is owned by National News Bureau of Thailand which is a unit under The Government Public Relations Department

See also

 Mass media in Thailand
 Television in Thailand
 List of radio stations in Thailand
 List of television stations in Thailand
 Channel 9 MCOT HD
 Digital terrestrial television in Thailand

References

External links

Television stations in Thailand
Television channels and stations established in 1988
State media
Publicly funded broadcasters